Blues for a Hip King is jazz album by South African artist Abdullah Ibrahim, released in 1989. The recordings are from several sessions in 1974, 1976 and 1979.

Track listing 
 "Ornette's Cornet" - 5:23
 "All Day & All Night Long" - 5:28
 "Sweet Basil Blues" - 6:21
 "Blue Monk" (Monk) - 6:06
 "Tsakwe Here Comes the Postman" - 11:45
 "Blues for a Hip King" - 9:47
 "Blues for B" - 3:27
 "Mysterioso" (Monk) - 4:41
 "Just You, Just Me" (Greer, Klages) - 4:59
 "Eclipse at Dawn" - 4:02
 "King Kong" (Todd Matshikiza) - 5:24
 "Khumbula Jane" - 5:55

Personnel 
Abdullah Ibrahim (aka Dollar Brand) (Piano)
Kippie Moeketsi (Alto Saxophone) - 4
Basil Coetzee (Tenor Saxophone, Flute) - 1-6
Duku Makasi (Tenor Saxophone) - 4
Sipho Gumede (Double Bass) - 4
Gilbert Mathews (Drums) - 4
Robbie Jansen (Alto Saxophone) - 1,2
Arthur Jacobs (Tenor Saxophone) - 1,2
Lionel Beukes (Fender Bass) - 1-3,5,6
Nazier Kapdi (Drums) - 1,2
Blue Mitchell (Trumpet and Flugelhorn) - 3,5,6
Buster Cooper (Trombone) - 3,5,6
Doug Sydes (Drums) - 3,5,6

External links 

1989 albums
Abdullah Ibrahim albums